Shtora-1 ("curtain") is an electro-optical active protection system or suite for tanks, designed to disrupt the laser designator and laser rangefinders of incoming anti-tank guided missiles (ATGMs). The system is mounted on the Russian T-80 and T-90 series tanks and the Ukrainian T-84. The existence of Shtora  was revealed in 1980 by Adolf Tolkachev.

Description
Shtora-1 is an electro-optical jammer that disrupts semiautomatic command to line of sight (SACLOS) antitank guided missiles, laser rangefinders and target designators. Shtora-1 is a  soft kill countermeasure system. The system was shown fitted to a Russian main battle tank during the International Defense Exposition, held in Abu Dhabi in 1995. The first known application of the system is the Russian T-90 main battle tank, which entered service in the Russian Army in 1993. It is also available on the BMP-3M infantry fighting vehicle.

Components

The Shtora-1 has four key components:

Two electro-optical/infrared (IR) "dazzlers" interface station one each mounted to the left and right of the main gun, which includes an infrared jammer, modulator, and control panel.

 A bank of forward firing grenade launchers or dischargers mounted on either side of the turret, which can fire grenades dispensing an aerosol smoke screen opaque to infrared light.
 A laser warning system with precision and coarse heads.
 A control system comprising control panel, microprocessor, and manual screen-laying panel. This processes the information from the sensors and activates the aerosol screen-laying system.
 Two infrared lights, one on each side of the main gun, continuously emit coded pulsed-infrared jamming when an incoming ATGM has been detected.

Shtora-1 has a field of view of 360 degrees horizontally and –5 to +25 degrees in elevation. It contains twelve aerosol screen launchers and weighs 400 kg. The screening aerosol takes less than three seconds to form and lasts about twenty seconds. The screen-laying range is from 50 to 70 meters.

According to Defense Update, the Shtora system can also locate the area within 3.5–5 degrees where the laser originated from and automatically slew the main gun to it, so that the tank crew can return fire and so that the stronger frontal turret armour is facing it.

Operating modes
Shtora-1 can operate in fully automatic or semi-automatic modes, continuously for six hours against anti-tank guided missile (ATGM) attack.

Specifications
According to Steven Zaloga and Tankomaster:
 Laser illumination sensors :
 2x TShU-1-11 precision sensors and 2x TShU-1 rough sensors
 Field of view (each): −5° .. +25° elevation and 90° azimuth
 Field of view (total): 360° azimuth
 EO interference emitters :
 2x OTShU-1-7
 Operating band: 0.7 .. 2.7 μm
 Protected sector: 4° elevation and 20° azimuth
 Energy consumption: 1 kW
 Light intensity: 20 mcd
 Anti-FLIR smoke grenades:
 12x 81 mm 3D17
 Obscured band: 0.4 .. 14 μm
 Bloom time: 3 s
 Cloud persistence: 20 s

Notes

References

Armoured fighting vehicle equipment
Weapons countermeasures
Weapons of Russia
Military equipment introduced in the 1980s